Winterthur Wallrüti railway station is a railway station in the Swiss canton of Zurich and city of Winterthur. The station is on the Winterthur to Etzwilen line. It is an intermediate stop on Zurich S-Bahn service S11, which links Aarau and Seuzach, and S29, which links Winterthur and Stein am Rhein.

References 

Railway stations in the canton of Zürich
Swiss Federal Railways stations